Gerald Braheen Moses (August 9, 1946 – March 27, 2018) was an American professional baseball player.

But after that season, he was included with Red Sox slugger Tony Conigliaro in a blockbuster trade to the  California Angels. He did not win the Angels' starting catcher job and batted only .227 in 1971, and then began his career as a journeyman, never spending more than one full season with the Angels, Cleveland Indians, New York Yankees, Detroit Tigers, San Diego Padres and Chicago White Sox. Moses was traded along with Graig Nettles from the Indians to the Yankees for John Ellis, Charlie Spikes, Rusty Torres and Jerry Kenney at the Winter Meetings on November 27, 1972. He served as Detroit's regular catcher in 1974.

All told, Moses played in 386 major league games and collected 269 hits.

Personal life and death
Moses had two children with his wife of fifty years, Carolyn (née Altieri).

After his playing career, Moses was extremely involved with the Major League Baseball Players Alumni Association, championing increased benefits for inactive, non-vested former players who did not originally qualify for pension benefits, and acting as a catalyst for countless charitable events, including the Legends for Youth Clinic Series. Beloved by many due to his kind-hearted nature, Moses served as the chairman emeritus for Major League Alumni Marketing until his death.

Though in failing health, Moses attended the anniversary to the Red Sox "Impossible Dream" season at Fenway Park in August 2017. A Catholic, he attended Mass every Sunday in Rowley, Massachusetts, for the last few years of his life.

Moses died on March 27, 2018 in Haverhill, Massachusetts. He was 71 and had been in failing health for some time.

References

External links
, or Retrosheet, or SABR Biography Project

1946 births
2018 deaths
Baseball players from Mississippi
Boston Red Sox players
California Angels players
Chicago White Sox players
Cleveland Indians players
Detroit Tigers players
Louisville Colonels (minor league) players
Major League Baseball catchers
New York Yankees players
People from Rowley, Massachusetts
People from Yazoo City, Mississippi
Pittsfield Red Sox players
San Diego Padres players
Wellsville Red Sox players
Winston-Salem Red Sox players